Myxococcus xanthus is a gram-negative, rod-shaped species of myxobacteria that exhibits various forms of self-organizing behavior in response to environmental cues. Under normal conditions with abundant food, it exists as a predatory, saprophytic single-species biofilm called a swarm. Under starvation conditions, it undergoes a multicellular development cycle.

Colony growth 
A swarm of M. xanthus is a distributed system, containing millions of bacteria that communicate among themselves in a non-centralized fashion. Simple patterns of cooperative behavior among the members of the colony combine to generate complex group behaviors in a process known as "stigmergy". For example, the tendency for one cell to glide only when in direct contact with another results in the colony forming swarms called "wolf-packs" that may measure up to several inches wide. This behavior is advantageous to the members of the swarm, as it increases the concentration of extracellular digestive enzymes secreted by the bacteria, thus facilitating predatory feeding. M. xanthus feeds on dead biomass of a broad range of bacteria and some fungi, discriminating live from dead cells, and causing cell death and lysis when required.

During stressful conditions, the bacteria undergo a process in which about 100,000 individual cells aggregate to form a structure called the fruiting body over the course of several hours. On the interior of the fruiting body, the rod-shaped cells differentiate into spherical, thick-walled spores. They undergo changes in the synthesis of new proteins, as well as alterations in the cell wall, which parallel the morphological changes. During these aggregations, dense ridges of cells move in ripples, which wax and wane over 5 hours.

Motility 

An important part of M. xanthus behavior is its ability to move on a solid surface by a mechanism called "gliding". Gliding Motility is a method of locomotion that allows for movement, without the help of flagella, on a solid surface. Gliding Motility is also called A-motility (adventurous). In A motility, single cells move, resulting in a distribution with many single cells. M. xanthus have the ability to use a second type of motility. This motility is called Social motility, single cells do not move, but cells that are close to one another move. This leads to a spatial distribution of cells with many clusters and few isolated single cells. This motility depend on the presence of the Type IV pili and diverse polysaccharides.

More than 37 genes are involved in the A-motility system, which comprises multiple motor elements that are arrayed along the entire cell body. Each motor element appears to be localized to the periplasmic space and is bound to the peptidoglycan layer. The motors are hypothesized to move on helical cytoskeletal filaments. Gliding force generated by these motors is coupled to adhesion sites that move freely in the outer membrane, and which provide a specific contact with the substratum, possibly aided by extracellular polysaccharide slime.

S-motility may represent a variation of twitching motility, since it is mediated by the extension and retraction of type IV pili that extend through the leading cell pole. The genes of the S-motility system appear to be homologs of genes involved in the biosynthesis, assembly, and function of twitching motility in other bacteria.

Cell differentiation, fruiting and sporulation 

In response to starvation, myxobacteria develop species-specific multicellular fruiting bodies. Starting from a uniform swarm of cells, some aggregate into fruiting bodies, while other cells remain in a vegetative state. Those cells that participate in formation of the fruiting body transform from rods into spherical, heat-resistant myxospores, while the peripheral cells remain rod-shaped. Although not as tolerant to environmental extremes as Bacillus endospores, the relative resistance of myxospores to desiccation and freezing enables myxobacteria to survive seasonally harsh environments. When a nutrient source becomes once again available, the myxospores germinate, shedding their spore coats to emerge into rod-shaped vegetative cells. The synchronized germination of thousands of myxospores from a single fruiting body enables the members of the new colony of myxobacteria to immediately engage in cooperative feeding. M. xanthus cells can also differentiate into environmentally-resistant spores in a starvation-independent manner. This process, known as chemically-induced sporulation, is triggered by the presence of glycerol and other chemical compounds at high concentrations. The biological implications of this sporulation process have been controversial for decades due to the unlikeliness to find such high concentrations of chemical inducers in their natural environment. However, the finding that the antifungal compound ambruticin acts as a potent natural inducer at concentrations expected to be present in soil, suggests that chemically induced sporulation is the result of competition and communication with the ambruticin-producing myxobacterium Sorangium cellulosum.

Intercellular communication 
It is very likely that cells communicate during the process of fruiting and sporulation, because a group of cells that starved together form myxospores inside fruiting bodies. Intercellular signal appears to be necessary to ensure that sporulation happens in the proper place and at the proper time. Research supports the existence of an extracellular signal, A-factor, which is necessary for developmental gene expression and for the development of a complete fruiting body.

Ability to eavesdrop 
It has been shown that an M. xanthus swarm is capable of eavesdropping on the extracellular signals that are produced by the bacteria it preys upon, leading to changes in swarm behaviour increasing its efficiency as a predator. This allows for a highly adaptive physiology that will have likely contributed to the near ubiquitous distribution of the myxobacteria.

Importance in research 
The complex life cycles of the myxobacteria make them very attractive models for the study of gene regulation as well as cell to cell interactions. The traits of M. xanthus make it very easy to study, and therefore important to research. Laboratory strains of M. xanthus are available that are capable of planktonic growth in shaker culture, so that they are easy to grow in large numbers. The tools of classical and molecular genetics are relatively well-developed in M. xanthus.

Although the fruiting bodies of M. xanthus are relatively primitive compared with, say, the elaborate structures produced by Stigmatella aurantiaca and other myxobacteria, the great majority of genes known to be involved in development are conserved across species. In order to make agar cultures of M. xanthus grow into fruiting bodies, one simply can plate the bacteria on starvation media. Furthermore, it is possible to artificially induce the production of myxospores without the intervening formation of fruiting bodies, by adding compounds such as glycerol or various metabolites to the medium. In this way, different stages in the developmental cycle can be experimentally isolated.

The genome of M. xanthus has been completely sequenced. The size of its genome may reflect the complexity of its life cycle. At 9.14 megabase, it had the largest known prokaryotic genome until the sequencing of Sorangium cellulosum (12.3 Mb), which is also a myxobacterium.

Developmental cheating 
Social cheating exists among M. xanthus commonly. As long as mutants are not too common, if they are unable to perform the group beneficial function of producing spores, they will still reap the benefit of the population as a whole. Research has shown that 4 different types of M. xanthus mutants showed forms of cheating during development, by being over-represented among spores relative to their initial frequency in the mixture.

Evolution 
In 2003, two scientists, Velicer and Yu, deleted certain parts of the M. xanthus genome, making it unable to swarm effectively on soft agar. Individuals were cloned, and allowed to evolve. After a period of 64 weeks, two of the evolving populations had started to swarm outward almost as effectively as normal wild-type colonies.  However, the patterns of the swarm were very different from those of the wild-type bacteria.  This suggested that they had developed a new way of moving, and Velicer and Yu confirmed this by showing that the new populations had not regained the ability to make pili, which allows wild-type bacteria to swarm.  This study addressed questions about the evolution of cooperation between individuals that had plagued scientists for years.

Very little is known about the evolutionary mechanisms present in M. xanthus. However, it has been discovered that it can establish a generalist predator relationship with different prey, among which is Escherichia coli. In this predator-prey relationship, a parallel evolution of both species is observed through genomic and phenotypic modifications, producing in subsequent generations a better adaptation of one of the species that is counteracted by the evolution of the other, following a co-evolutionary model known Red Queen hypothesis. However, the evolutionary mechanisms present in M. xanthus that produce this parallel evolution are still unknown.

Strains 
 Myxococcus xanthus DK 1622
 Myxococcus xanthus DZ2
 Myxococcus xanthus DZF1
 Myxococcus xanthus NewJersey2
 Myxococcus xanthus DSM16526T

Whole genome comparisons have indicated that M. virescens is the same species as M. xanthus. M. virescens was first described in 1892, so has precedence.

References

External links 
 Model Organism Database
 John Kirby at the University of Iowa
 Dale Kaiser Lab at Stanford University
 Watching social behaviour evolve
 Taxonomic Information for Myxococcus xanthus
Type strain of Myxococcus xanthus at BacDive -  the Bacterial Diversity Metadatabase

Videos 
 Myxococcus xanthus preying on an E. coli colony
 Myxococcus xanthus fruiting body formation
 Myxococcus xanthus ripples – Predation
 Predatory bacterial crowdsourcing

Myxococcota
Articles containing video clips
Bacteria described in 1941